was the ninth of twenty-four s, built for the Imperial Japanese Navy following World War I. When introduced into services, these ships were the most powerful destroyers in the world. They served as first-line destroyers through the 1930s, and remained formidable weapons systems well into the Pacific War.

History
Construction of the advanced Fubuki-class destroyers was authorized as part of the Imperial Japanese Navy's expansion program from fiscal 1923, intended to give Japan a qualitative edge with the world's most modern ships. The Fubuki class had performance that was a quantum leap over previous destroyer designs, so much so that they were designated . The large size, powerful engines, high speed, large radius of action and unprecedented armament gave these destroyers the firepower similar to many light cruisers in other navies. Isonami, built at the Uraga Dock Company was laid down on 19 October 1926, launched on 24 November 1927 and commissioned on 30 June 1928. Originally assigned hull designation “Destroyer No. 43”, she was completed as Isonami.

Operational history
During the Second Sino-Japanese War, from 1937, Isonami covered landing of Japanese forces in Shanghai and Hangzhou. From 1940, she was assigned to patrol and cover landings of Japanese forces in south China.

World War II history
At the time of the attack on Pearl Harbor, Isonami was assigned to Destroyer Division 19 of Desron 3 of the IJN 1st Fleet, and had deployed from Kure Naval District to the port of Samah on Hainan Island. On 27 February, Isonami was assigned to "Operation J" (the invasion of Java), and "Operation T" (the invasion of northern Sumatra) on 12 March and the "Operation D" (the invasion of the Andaman Islands on 23 March. She served patrol and escort duties out of Port Blair during the Japanese raids into the Indian Ocean. On 13–22 April Isonami returned via Singapore and Camranh Bay to Kure Naval Arsenal, for maintenance.

On 4–5 June, Isonami participated in the Battle of Midway as part of Admiral Isoroku Yamamoto’s main fleet. While returning from the battle, she was damaged in a collision with Uranami and limped back to Yokosuka Naval Arsenal for repairs, which were not completed to the end of July. She was assigned to patrols out of Truk in October, and to "Tokyo Express" transport missions to various locations in the Solomon Islands to mid January 1943.

On 1 December, Isonami was damaged off Buna, New Guinea, in an air strike by United States Army Air Forces planes. On 18 December, she rescued the survivors from the torpedoed cruiser .

In early January, Isonami returned to Kure Naval Arsenal for repairs. In February, she escorted a troop convoy from Pusan to Palau and on to Wewak. On 25 February, she was reassigned to the Southwest Area Fleet and was based at Surabaya to escort convoys throughout the Netherlands East Indies.

Of her crew, seven were killed and another nine injured.

On 1 August 1943, Isonami was removed from the navy list.

Notes

References

External links

Fubuki-class destroyers
Ships built by Uraga Dock Company
1927 ships
Second Sino-Japanese War naval ships of Japan
World War II destroyers of Japan
Ships sunk by American submarines
World War II shipwrecks in the Pacific Ocean
Maritime incidents in April 1943